ABM Anowarul Haque is a Bangladesh Awami League politician and the former Member of Parliament of Manikganj-1.

Career
Haque was elected to parliament from Manikganj-1 as a Bangladesh Awami League candidate in 2008.

References

Awami League politicians
Living people
9th Jatiya Sangsad members
1949 births